Flood tide is the rising tide of an ocean, the opposite of ebb tide

It may also refer to:
 Flood Tide (novel), a novel by Clive Cussler
 Flood Tide (1934 film), a British drama film
 Flood Tide (1958 film), an American drama romance film
 Flood Tide, an anthology of short fiction in the Merovingen Nights science fiction series

See also
 Floodtide, a 1948 British romantic drama